Heim is a municipality in Trøndelag county, Norway. It was established on 1 January 2020 upon the merger of three other municipalities. It is located in the traditional district of Fosen. The administrative centre of the municipality is the village of Kyrksæterøra. Other villages in Heim include Ytre Snillfjord, Heim, Hellandsjøen, Holla, Vinjeøra, Liabøen, Todalen, Halsanaustan, Valsøyfjord, Engan, Hjellnes, and Valsøybotnen.

The  municipality is the 113th largest by area out of the 356 municipalities in Norway. Heim is the 160th most populous municipality in Norway with a population of 5,884.

General information
The municipality was established on 1 January 2020 upon the merger of the neighboring municipalities of Hemne and Halsa as well as the Ytre Snillfjord area in the municipality of Snillfjord. The area in the municipality of Halsa left Møre og Romsdal county and switched to Trøndelag county when the merger occurred.

Name
The parish of Heim was established in 1884. It is named after the old Heim farm, since the first Heim Church was built on its ground. The name is identical with the word heimr which means "home", "homestead", or "farm".

Coat of arms
The coat of arms for Heim was designed and granted in 2019. It is a blue shield with a white ornamental design in the centre. The design was chosen to symbolize many different things. The blue background refers to air, water, and the sea. The white design is reminiscent of boats, fjords, seeds, and church spires, all of which are a part of the culture of the municipality.

Churches
The Church of Norway has five parishes within the municipality of Heim. It is part of the Orkdal prosti (deanery) within the Diocese of Nidaros.

Government
All municipalities in Norway, including Heim, are responsible for primary education (through 10th grade), outpatient health services, senior citizen services, unemployment and other social services, zoning, economic development, and municipal roads. The municipality is governed by a municipal council of elected representatives, which in turn elects a mayor.  The municipality falls under the Trøndelag District Court and the Frostating Court of Appeal.

Municipal council
The municipal council  of Heim is made up of 31 representatives that are elected to four year terms. The party breakdown of the council is as follows:

Notable people 

 Nils Anton Vaagland (1872 in Halsa – 1965) lawyer and politician, Mayor of Stjørdal 1911 to 1925
 Leif Halse (1896 in Halsa – 1984) a teacher, novelist, short story writer, children's writer, comics writer and local historian
 Anne Karin Elstad (1938 in Halsa – 2012) a Norwegian author
 Nina Valsø (1962 in Halsa – 2002) a Norwegian playwright 
 Erik Hoftun (born 1969 in Kyrksæterøra) a Norwegian former football defender with 520 club caps and 30 for Norway
 Else-May Norderhus (born 1973 in Halsa) a Norwegian politician
 Vegard Forren (born 1988 in Kyrksæterøra) a Norwegian professional footballer with over 300 club caps and 33 for Norway

Gallery

References

External links

Official website 

 
Municipalities of Trøndelag
2020 establishments in Norway
Populated places established in 2020